José María Mora (September 2, 1847 – October 18, 1926) was a Cuban-American portrait photographer active in New York City during the 1870s and 1880s.

Early life and education

The son of wealthy Cuban landowners, Mora was living in Paris and training as a painter in 1868 when the start of the Ten Years’ War forced his family to flee their home in Havana and resettle in New York City.

Career

Unable to continue his study of painting once he joined his family in New York, Mora found employment with celebrity photographer Napoleon Sarony who trained him in the photographic portrait business and the art of painted retouching -- an early form of photo-manipulation. After two years with Sarony, Mora founded his own portrait studio and went on to become a friendly rival to his former mentor and contemporary stage photographers such as Benjamin J. Falk. 

Mora specialized in producing cabinet card portrait photographs of Gilded Age celebrities, including actors, opera performers, writers, and prominent members of New York City Society. He was the portraitist of choice for the New York Metropolitan Opera and Manhattan's high-society costume balls during the 1870s and 1880s, and his photographs of comic actors, burlesque dancers, and clowns regularly appeared in the pages of illustrated newspapers such as the National Police Gazette. What set Mora's work apart from competing photographers was his use of large-scale painted backdrops that made his subjects appear to be transported to exotic or fantastical locations.

Death

Mora died at the Breslin Hotel in Manhattan in 1926 and was buried in Woodlawn Cemetery, Bronx New York.

References

External links

Erin Pauwels. "José María Mora and the Migrant Surround in American Portrait Photography" Journal Panorama
Jose Maria Mora, Broadway Photographs
MCNY: New York Stories Mora—Photographer of the Rich and Famous
THE CABINET CARD GALLERY:Photographer-Mora CabinetCard.Wordpress, page on Mora and many examples of his photographic work

1847 births
1926 deaths
American portrait photographers
Cuban photographers
19th-century American photographers